Dysbatus is a genus of moths in the family Geometridae.

Species
 Dysbatus singularis Butler, 1886
 Dysbatus stenodesma (Lower, 1899)

References
 Dysbatus at Markku Savela's Lepidoptera and Some Other Life Forms
 Natural History Museum Lepidoptera genus database

Nacophorini